The 2024 FIFA Futsal World Cup will be the tenth edition of the FIFA Futsal World Cup, the quadrennial international futsal championship contested by the men's national teams of the member associations of FIFA. The tournament host is yet to be determined.

Portugal is the defending champion, defeating Argentina in the final, 2–1.

Host selection
AFC
 Iran
 India

CAF

 Morocco

CONCACAF

 Guatemala
 United States
 Mexico
 Nicaragua

Qualification
A total of 24 teams qualify for the final tournament, in addition, one country will qualify automatically as host, 23 other teams qualify from six separate continental competitions.

Russia was banned from participation due to the country's invasion of Ukraine.

Venues
To Be Confirmed

References

FIFA Futsal World Cup
Scheduled association football competitions
2024 in sports